Wittgenstein's Mistress by David Markson is a highly stylized, experimental novel in the tradition of Samuel Beckett.  The novel is mainly a series of statements made in the first person; the protagonist is a woman named Kate who believes herself to be the last human on earth.  Though her statements shift quickly from topic to topic, the topics often recur, and often refer to Western cultural icons, ranging from Zeno to Beethoven to Willem de Kooning. Readers familiar with Ludwig Wittgenstein's Tractatus Logico-Philosophicus will recognize stylistic similarities to that work.

Though Markson's original manuscript was rejected fifty-four times, the book, when finally published in 1988 by Dalkey Archive Press, was met with critical acclaim.  In particular, the New York Times Book Review praised it for "address[ing] formidable philosophic questions with tremendous wit." A decade later, David Foster Wallace described it as "pretty much the high point of experimental fiction in this country" in an article for Salon entitled "Five direly underappreciated U.S. novels >1960." Wallace also wrote a long essay on the novel detailing its connections with Wittgenstein, entitled "The Empty Plenum: David Markson’s Wittgenstein's Mistress" for the 1990 Review of Contemporary Fiction. (In 2012, it was added to the novel as an afterword.)

Allusions
Wittgenstein's Mistress is heavy with allusions, references, and parallels right from the title. Several of these include, but are not limited to:  Vincent van Gogh, William Gaddis, Ludwig Wittgenstein, Helen of Troy, Achilles, William Shakespeare, and Johannes Brahms. Many of these are used to play with the themes, particularly language and memory, and draw parallels between the narrator, Kate, most notably Helen of Troy.

Themes

The novel explores many themes, most notably memory, language, and loneliness. The faultiness of memory plays a large part throughout the novel, as the narrator constantly gets facts wrong, sometimes correcting herself, other times contradicting herself. These include a variety of topics, ranging from art history to the narrator's past, from facts about her house to even what day it is. Her awareness of her faulty memory creates an uncertainty that gives her anxiety, best demonstrated in the painting of the house section early in the novel.

Much like the philosopher the novel is named after, language has a very important role in the work. The character feels alone because she cannot communicate with anyone but herself, though she is communicating her ideas to the reader. The fluidity of language is also touched upon. Kate discusses how she once read an English translation of Euripides that was influenced by Shakespeare, then later reflects on Greek translations of Shakespeare that was probably influenced by Euripides.

The main theme is loneliness. The novel itself is the byproduct of the narrator, Kate, typing at a typewriter in her own house any thought that comes to her head. Her thoughts rarely describe any non-famous, non-mythical character that isn't dead or has left her life. David Foster Wallace described the novel as an important example of "serious fiction," particularly in its examination of solipsism. Kate seems to exhibit solipsism syndrome, most notably near the end of the book. Many of her anxieties come from feelings of loneliness, abandonment, and betrayal, combined with her conviction that language is insufficient for communicating the events of one’s inner life.

Release details
 1988, USA, Dalkey Archive Press, May 1988, Hardback
 1989, UK, Jonathan Cape, August 1989, Hardback
 1990, USA, Dalkey Archive Press, February 1990, Paperback (reprinted twice)
 1995, USA, Dalkey Archive Press, May 1995, Second paperback edition (with afterword by Steven Moore) (reprinted five times)
 2012, USA, Dalkey Archive Press, March 2012, Third paperback edition (with afterword by David Foster Wallace)

References

1988 American novels
American philosophical novels
Postmodern novels
Ludwig Wittgenstein
Dalkey Archive Press books